Natalya Vladimirovna Shibayeva (born 28 July 1968) is a retired Ukrainian swimmer. She won three medals for the Soviet Union at the 1986 World Aquatics Championships and 1985 European Aquatics Championships. She also competed in the 100 m and 200 m backstroke events at the 1992 Summer Olympics for the Unified Team, but did not reach the finals.

She retired from swimming in 1992 and in 1993 graduated from the University of Kharkiv with a degree in history. In 2002, she defended her PhD and then worked as assistant professor in economics at the same university.

She is married to a former Olympic swimmer and coach Mikhail Zubkov. Their daughter Kateryna Zubkova (born 14 July 1988) is also an Olympic swimmer.

References

1968 births
Living people
Female backstroke swimmers
Swimmers at the 1992 Summer Olympics
Soviet female swimmers
Olympic swimmers of the Unified Team
Ukrainian female swimmers
Sportspeople from Kharkiv
National University of Kharkiv alumni
World Aquatics Championships medalists in swimming
European Aquatics Championships medalists in swimming